The Freedom Trophy is a cricket trophy that is awarded to the winner of Test series, known as The Freedom Series,  between India and South Africa. First awarded in 2015, the trophy is dedicated to Mahatma Gandhi and Nelson Mandela.

Background Test Series
Prior to the trophy's inception, India and South Africa had played eleven series, six in South Africa and five in India. The overall record was six South African victories, two Indian victories, and three drawn series.

In 2015 BCCI and CSA announced that all future bilateral tours of India and South Africa to be named as Mahatma Gandhi-Nelson Mandela Bilateral series. The series is played in Test cricket format. The series is named after leaders of both countries to pay tribute to them for playing a major role in winning independence by nonviolence. This has also helped in gaining an "iconic and traditional status" to the series.

List of The Freedom Series

Summary of results

Match venues

See also
Anthony de Mello Trophy
Pataudi Trophy
Border-Gavaskar Trophy
Basil D'Oliveira Trophy

References

External links

Test cricket competitions
India in international cricket
South Africa in international cricket
Cricket awards and rankings
Memorials to Mahatma Gandhi
Nelson Mandela